The Acronym Institute for Disarmament Diplomacy is a Non-governmental organization (NGO) founded in 1995 by Rebecca Johnson, senior advisor to the United Nations' United Nations Monitoring, Verification and Inspection Commission chaired by Hans Blix from January 2000 to June 2003. It states as its goal "to promote effective approaches to international security, disarmament and arms control. Engaging with governments and civil society, Acronym provides reporting, analysis and strategic thinking on a range of issues relevant to peace and security, with special emphasis on treaties and multilateral initiatives."

The Acronym Institute was founded by Johnson as a continuation of her work for The Acronym Consortium (VERTIC, ISIS, BASIC, and Dfax), which had dissolved into its constituent parts in October 1995. In the negotiations for the Comprehensive Nuclear-Test-Ban Treaty (CTBT) in the mid 1990s, following end of the Cold War, the Acronym Institute was regarded as the lead NGO negotiator by many official delegations to the negotiations.

The Acronym Institute published the journal Disarmament Diplomacy from 1996 to 2009 on a bi-monthly basis, with an overview of events relating to weapons proliferation and disarmament.

See also
 Bulletin of the Atomic Scientists
 International Panel on Fissile Materials

References

External links
The Acronym Institute

Arms control
Organisations based in London